The 2018 Star Sports Greyhound Derby took place during May and June with the final being held on 2 June 2018 at Towcester Greyhound Stadium. The winner Dorotas Wildcat won £175,000 and was trained by Kevin Hutton, owned by Hutton and Dave Usher and bred by Jim Gurney.

It is the second time that the event was held at Towcester.

Final Result 

At Towcester (over 500 metres): Winner £175,000

Final Distances 
1½, ¾, ½, 2¼, 1¼ (lengths) 0.08 sec = one length

Quarter finals

Semi finals

Competition Review

The mandatory first round consisted of 26 heats, with only 35% of the field being eliminated, a percentage that included the 20-1 ante post favourite and All England Cup champion, Droopys Expert, Scottish Greyhound Derby champion The Other Reg and Irish star Clonbrien Hero. Whoops Jack impressed during the first set of heats winning in 29.33 and on the second night Droopys Verve (29.16) and Sporting Dave (29.29) stood out. The final set of heats were the most impressive with wins for Bombers Bullet (29.08), Tyrur Harold (29.29) and Puppy Derby champion Magical Bale (29.07).

Mark Wallis won four of the first eight heats of the second round with Bruisers Bullet going fastest in 29.05. Bombers Bullet, Whoops Jack and Sporting Dave all won well again but Magical Bale crashed out. The remaining second round heats the following evening saw Dorotas Wildcat and Droopys Biker impress in times of 29.07 and 29.16 respectively. Tyrur Harold was eliminated.

Bubbly Bluebird came to life on a fast track in the third round, becoming the first greyhound to break 29 seconds so far when defeating Bombers Bullet by a head in 28.94. This was followed by Irish hound Crossfield Will, Matt Dartnall's Rising Brandy and Dorotas Wildcat who all impressed winning in 28.81, 28.89 and 28.79 respectively. Sporting Dave and Droopys Biker were both eliminated before the final heat saw the youngster Droopys Verve win in 28.76 and maintain his record of finishing in the top two in every race that he had competed in so far.

The real test during the Derby is the quick run from third round to quarter finals and Dorotas Wildcat passed the test with flying colours winning heat 2 in 29.17. This was then topped by Droopys Verve who won in a fast time of 28.88 defeating Bruisers Bullet by 2¼ lengths. Rising Brandy took heat 4 in 29.01.

Droopys Verve impressed again in the semi finals defeating Bombers Bullet in 28.91. The race saw first bend bumping which left Dorotas Vic to claim the final qualifying spot. In the second semi final the early pace of Whoopys Jack ensured an Irish runner made the final, Dorotas Wildcat and Bruisers Bullet took the remaining final slots.

In the final Dorotas Wildcat made a fast 5.15sec start, which saw him clear of the two greyhounds on his inside, he led all the way comfortably holding off the favourite Droopys Verve. In a clean final Dorotas Vic broke well and held on to third place, Bruisers Bullet ran on well for fourth, Bombers Bullet and Whoops Jack made poor starts and could not recover.

See also 
 2018 UK & Ireland Greyhound Racing Year

References

Greyhound Derby
English Greyhound Derby
English Greyhound Derby
English Greyhound Derby
English Greyhound Derby
Sport in Northamptonshire